Gnathmocerodes is a genus of moths belonging to the subfamily Olethreutinae of the family Tortricidae.

Species
Gnathmocerodes alphestis (Meyrick, 1922)
Gnathmocerodes euplectra (Lower, 1908)
Gnathmocerodes labidophora Diakonoff, 1973
Gnathmocerodes lecythocera (Meyrick, 1937)
Gnathmocerodes ophiocosma (Turner, 1946)
Gnathmocerodes petrifraga Diakonoff, 1968
Gnathmocerodes tonsoria (Meyrick, 1909)

See also
List of Tortricidae genera

References

External links
tortricidae.com

Olethreutini
Tortricidae genera
Taxa named by Alexey Diakonoff